Onepoto is the name of a volcanic explosion crater (or maar) on the North Shore in Auckland, New Zealand. It is a part of the Auckland volcanic field. It should not be confused with Onepoto Hill, which is a volcanic feature of the South Auckland volcanic field.

History

Located near the approaches to the Auckland Harbour Bridge, it was created by a series of eruptions approximately 185,000 years ago. The crater first became a freshwater lake, and later became a tidal lagoon when sea level rose to the present level 7,000 years ago after the last ice age. The crater's floor has been reclaimed, with recreational sports fields and a pond, and some parts of the tuff ring were quarried away in the 1950s to provide fill for the Northern Motorway.

Onepoto and neighbouring Tank Farm were fresh water lakes when sea levels were lower using the Last Glacial Maximum. As sea levels rose, the waters of the Waitematā Harbour breached the tuff rings of the craters, becoming tidal lagoons.

See also
Onepoto Bridge, a bridge offering views of the area
Tank Farm, a neighbouring crater

References
Volcanoes of Auckland: The Essential guide - Hayward, B.W., Murdoch, G., Maitland, G.; Auckland University Press, 2011.

Volcanoes of Auckland: A Field Guide. Hayward, B.W.; Auckland University Press, 2019, 335 pp. .

External links
Photographs of Onepoto held in Auckland Libraries' heritage collections.

Auckland volcanic field
Maars of New Zealand
Volcanoes of the Auckland Region
Waitematā Harbour